Diminazene (INN; also known as diminazen) is an anti-infective medication for animals that is sold under a variety of brand names. It is effective against certain protozoa such as Babesia, Trypanosoma, and Cytauxzoon. The drug may also be effective against certain bacteria including Brucella and Streptococcus.

Chemically it is a di-amidine and it is formulated as its aceturate salt, diminazene aceturate.

The mechanism is not well understood; it probably inhibits DNA replication, but also has affinity to RNA.


Side effects
Acute side effects include vomiting, diarrhea, and hypotension (low blood pressure). Diminazen can harm the liver, kidneys and brain, which is potentially life-threatening; camels are especially susceptible to these effects.

Resistance
The Gibe River Valley in southwest Ethiopia showed universal resistance between July 1989 and February 1993. This likely indicates a permanent loss of function in this area against the tested target, T. congolense isolated from Boran cattle.

References 

Amidines
Antiprotozoal agents
Veterinary drugs